"There She Goes" is a song by English singer-songwriter Taio Cruz from his third studio album, TY.O. The track was released physically and digitally as the album's third single on 20 April 2012 in Germany. The song features vocals from American rapper, pop singer-songwriter and record producer Pitbull. The track was later selected to be released as the album's third single in the United Kingdom, being released on 25 June 2012. However, the British release of the track does not feature Pitbull. The track peaked at #12 on the UK Singles Chart.

Music video
The official music video for "There She Goes" was uploaded to Cruz' official YouTube channel on 16 May 2012, at a total length of three minutes and thirty-nine seconds. The video does not feature Pitbull and does not feature his vocals as well. It features Cruz and Uzbek supermodel Nadya Nepomnyashaya in a diner out in the middle of the desert, before taking her across country to a posh nightclub, where the pair perform the song together. It also features a number of mysterious motorcycle riders who drive around Cruz in a parking lot, and a flare display across the desert skyline.

Track listing
 German CD single
 "There She Goes" – 3:46
 "There She Goes" (No Pitbull) – 3:29

 UK Digital download EP
 "There She Goes" (No Pitbull) – 3:28
 "There She Goes" (Moto Blanco Remix) – 3:25
 "There She Goes" (Moto Blanco Extended Remix) - 7:13
 "There She Goes" (Rack 'N' Ruin Remix) – 3:25

Credits and personnel
Lead vocals – Taio Cruz, Pitbull
Producers – RedOne, Jimmy Joker
Lyrics – Taio Cruz, RedOne, Armando Perez, Jimmy Joker, AJ Junior, Bilal Hajji
Label: Island Records

Charts and certifications

Weekly charts

Year-end charts

Certifications

Release history

References

2012 singles
Taio Cruz songs
Songs written by Bilal Hajji
Songs written by Taio Cruz
Songs written by RedOne
Songs written by Pitbull (rapper)
2011 songs
Island Records singles
Songs written by AJ Junior
Songs written by Jimmy Thörnfeldt
Song recordings produced by RedOne